Van der Mark or Vandermark is a surname. Notable people with the surname include:

Ken Vandermark (born 1964), American jazz musician
Michael van der Mark (born 1992), Dutch motorcycle racer

Surnames of Dutch origin